Richard "Rab" Scott (14 November 1956 – May 2021) was an English professional darts player who competed in the 1980s.

Career 
He twice competed in the BDO World Darts Championship but was defeated in the first round by the fellow Englishmen Alan Glazier in 1984 and John Cosnett in 1985.

Rab was also registered for Walton in the Essex Men's Superleague. Rab quit the BDO in 1985.

World Championship results

BDO
 1984: Last 32: (lost to Alan Glazier 1–2) (sets)
 1985: Last 32: (lost to John Cosnett 0–2)

References

External links
Profile and stats on Darts Database

1956 births
2021 deaths
British Darts Organisation players
English darts players